Eastwood (June 6, 1894 – March 20, 1896) was a borough that existed for a brief period of time in Bergen County, New Jersey, United States. It was formed at the height of the "boroughitis" fever that led to the creation of 26 new municipalities in the county during 1894.

Eastwood was formed from portions of Harrington Township, New Jersey and Washington Township in the area on the west of present-day River Vale and east of Westwood. As stated in History of Bergen County, New Jersey, "Eastwood caught the borough fever in March, 1894, and was organized as a borough, but in a short time it became tired of borough life and returned to Washington township from which it was set off." Eastwood's demise made it the only borough in Bergen County to be dissolved after its creation.

Old Tappan gained portions from Harrington Township circa 1896 of what had been Eastwood. When River Vale was incorporated in 1906, it included area that had been part of the Borough of Eastwood.

References

Sources 
History of Bergen County, New Jersey, 1630–1923; by Westervelt, Frances A., 1858–1942.
Municipal Incorporations of the State of New Jersey (according to Counties) prepared by the Division of Local Government, Department of the Treasury (New Jersey); December 1, 1958.

External links
Bergen County Townships and Municipalities 

Washington Township, Bergen County, New Jersey
Geography of Bergen County, New Jersey
Former boroughs in New Jersey